The 2019 Oregon State Beavers men's soccer team represented Oregon State University during the 2020 NCAA Division I men's soccer season and the 2020 Pac-12 Conference men's soccer season. The 2019 season was Terry Boss's third year as head coach for the program.

Background

Effects of the COVID-19 pandemic on the season 
On August 13, 2020, the Pac-12 Conference postponed all fall sports through the end of the calendar year.

On November 4, 2020, the NCAA approved a plan for college soccer to be played in the spring.

Schedule 

|-
!colspan=7 style=""| Non-conference regular season
|-

|-
!colspan=7 style=""| Pac-12 Conference season
|-

|-
!colspan=7 style=""| NCAA Tournament
|-

References 

2020
Oregon State Beavers
Oregon State Beavers
Oregon State Beavers men's soccer
Oregon State